William Stearman (1813 – 11 April 1846) was an English first-class cricketer active 1836–40 who played for Kent. He was born in Aldborough, Norfolk and died in Thurgarton. He played in 15 first-class matches.

References

1813 births
1846 deaths
English cricketers
Kent cricketers
Non-international England cricketers
People from North Norfolk (district)